Pachychilidae, common name pachychilids, is a taxonomic family of freshwater snails, gastropod molluscs in the clade Sorbeoconcha.

Distribution 

Pachychilids are freshwater snails with a worldwide distribution in the tropics. Representatives are found in South and Central America, Africa, Madagascar, South and South-east Asia and tropical Australia (Queensland: Torres Strait Islands).

Description 
Pachychilids have an operculum, which is concentric and multispiral.

Ecology 
All species in the family inhabit freshwater except Faunus ater, which is a brackish water snail found in estuaries and other coastal habitats. Pachychilids are either oviparous (lay eggs), ovoviviparous or viviparous (retain developing eggs and youngs in special incubatory structures).

Notes on the taxonomy 
The name is derived from a combination of the words 'pachy' (Greek = thick) and the suffix '-chilus' (Greek = Lip), meaning 'thick lipped' - with respect to the thickened aperture of the shell in some species. 
Most 20th-century authors did not recognize Pachychilidae as an independent family, but affiliated species under different groups, such as Thiaridae and Pleuroceridae. However, recent revisions based on molecular and morphological evidence have proven their independent and distinct status from the former. 
This family has no subfamilies (according to the taxonomy of the Gastropoda by Bouchet & Rocroi, 2005).

Genera 

Genera within the family Pachychilidae include:
 † Bellatara Strand, 1928 - with only one species Bellatara janus (Mayer, 1870)
 Brotia H. Adams, 1866 
 Doryssa Swainson, 1840
 † Eginea Pacaud & Harzhauser, 2012
 Faunus de Montfort, 1810 with the only species Faunus ater (Linnaeus, 1758)
 Jagora Köhler & Glaubrecht, 2003
 † Jponsia Pacaud & Harzhauser, 2012
 Madagasikara Köhler & Glaubrecht, 2010 - synonym: Melanatria Bowdich, 1822 auctt.
 † Nodifaunus Olsson, 1944
 Pachychilus I. Lea & H. C. Lea, 1851 - type genus of the family Pachychilidae
 Paracrostoma Cossmann, 1900 
 Potadoma Swainson, 1840
 † Pseudobellardia Cox, 1931
 Pseudopotamis Martens, 1894
 Sulcospira Troschel, 1858 - synonym: Adamietta Brandt, 1974  
 † Tinnyea Hantken, 1887
 Tylomelania Sarasin & Sarasin, 1897
 † Wingeastonia K. Martin, 1906
Genera brought into synonymy
 Acrostoma Brot, 1871: synonym of Paracrostoma Cossmann, 1900
 Antimelania P. Fischer & Crosse, 1892: synonym of Brotia H. Adams, 1866
 Brotella Rovereto, 1899: synonym of Paracrostoma Cossmann, 1900
 Fauninae Cossmann, 1909 (subfamily) : synonym of Pachychilidae P. Fischer & Crosse, 1892
 Melanatria Bowdich, 1822: synonym of Faunus Montfort, 1810
 Oxymelania Crosse & P. Fischer, 1892: synonym of Pachychilus I. Lea & H. C. Lea, 1851
 Pirena Lamarck, 1822: synonym of Faunus Montfort, 1810
 Sphaeromelania Rovereto, 1899: synonym of Pachychilus I. Lea & H. C. Lea, 1851
 Wanga Chen, 1943: synonym of Brotia H. Adams, 1866

Cladogram
A cladogram based on sequences of mitochondrial 16S ribosomal RNA sequences showing phylogenic relations of Pachychilidae:

References

Further reading 
 Köhler F., von Rintelen T., Meyer A. & Glaubrecht M. (2004). "Multiple origin of viviparity in southeast Asian gastropods (Cerithioidea: Pachychilidae) and its evolutionary implications". Evolution 58(10): 2215-2226. .

External links 
 

 
Gastropod families